Birgit Viguurs (born 24 June 1972) is a former Dutch woman cricketer. She has played for Dutch cricket team in 13 Women's ODIs. Birgit was also the member of the Netherlands cricket team in the inaugural edition of the Women's Cricket World Cup Qualifier in 2003.

References 

1972 births
Living people
Dutch women cricketers
Netherlands women One Day International cricketers
People from Vught